State Highway 108 (abbreviated SH-108) is a minor state highway in Payne, Noble, and Pawnee counties in north-central Oklahoma. SH-108 has no lettered spurs.

SH-108 was added to the state highway system on July 11, 1955. At this time, the highway had the same extent as it does today; the only changes made to the highway over the years were slight modifications to its alignment due to the straightening of connecting highways.

Route description
SH-108 begins in Payne County approximately halfway between Perkins and Cushing at SH-33. From here, the highway runs north on Ripley Road. About  into its journey, the road passes through the town of Ripley (pop. 444). North of Ripley, it crosses the Cimarron River.  Seven miles (11 km) later, the highway intersects SH-51, and SH-108 turns west along it, forming a one-mile (1.6 km) concurrency. SH-108 then continues north on Rose Road.

The highway then crosses the Cimarron Turnpike on a grade separation with no interchange. The highway shifts to the east about one mile (1.6 km) north of Glencoe. Upon exiting Payne County, the highway straddles the Noble–Pawnee County line all the way to its terminus at US-64 in the unincorporated settlement of Lela.

As of 2012, the highest average annual daily traffic (AADT) count along SH-108 was 5,900, measured along the concurrency with SH-51. The highest traffic volume on SH-108 alone was an AADT of 1,900, measured north of SH-51. The lowest AADT measured was 1,500, which occurred both in Glencoe and south of Ripley. No part of SH-108 has been designated as part of the National Highway System.

History
SH-108 was first designated on July 11, 1955. The highway was mostly gravel at that time; only the portions from the southern terminus to Ripley and the concurrency with SH-51 were paved. In 1960, the section of SH-108 between SH-51 and Glencoe was paved. In 1963, the paved segment extended north of Glencoe, to the highway's northern terminus.

The first change to the highway's alignment occurred on November 1, 1966, when SH-51 was straightened between Stillwater and Yale; SH-108 was realigned to continue to concur with SH-51. Around the same time, the remainder of SH-108 was paved. The final change to SH-108 was made on June 4, 1974, when a straightening of SH-33 resulted in a slight extension of SH-108 to continue to meet the new highway. No changes have been made since.

Junction list

Notes

References

External links

 SH-108 at OKHighways

108
Transportation in Payne County, Oklahoma
Transportation in Noble County, Oklahoma
Transportation in Pawnee County, Oklahoma